Tooting Broadway is a London Underground station in Tooting in the London Borough of Wandsworth, South London.

It is located on the corner of Tooting High Street (A24) and Mitcham Road (A217).

Location
The station building is a corner lot, located at the junction of two major roads, which are A24 Tooting High Street and A217 Garratt Lane. South Thames College is just outside the station, while St. George's Hospital is a few minutes' walk away. Other attractions nearby include Tooting Market, Tooting Methodist Church and Tooting Primary School. The station is located in the centre of a busy district and serves a dense residential area. The area is commonly referred to as Tooting Graveney.

History
In the period following the end of First World War, the Underground Electric Railways Company of London (UERL) began reviving a series of prewar plans for line extensions and improvements that had been postponed during the hostilities. Finance for the works was made possible by the government's Trade Facilities Act 1921, which, as a means of alleviating unemployment, provided for the Treasury to underwrite the value of loans raised by companies for public works.

One of the projects that had been postponed was the Wimbledon and Sutton Railway (W&SR), a plan for a new surface line from Wimbledon to Sutton over which the UERL's District Railway had control. The UERL wished to maximise its use of the government's time-limited financial backing, and, in November 1922, presented bills to parliament to construct the W&SR in conjunction with an extension of the UERL's City and South London Railway (C&SLR) south from  through Balham, Tooting and Merton.

The C&SLR would connect to the W&SR route south of Morden station and run trains to Sutton and the District Railway would run trains between Wimbledon and Sutton. Under these proposals, the station on the C&SLR extension would have been named "North Morden" and the station on the W&SR route would have been called "South Morden" (the current Morden South station is in a different location).

The Southern Railway objected to this encroachment into its area of operation and the anticipated loss of its passenger traffic to the C&SLR's more direct route to central London. The UERL and SR reached an agreement in July 1923 that enabled the C&SLR to extend as far as Morden in exchange for the UERL giving up its rights over the W&SR route. Construction of the C&SLR extension was rapidly carried out and Tooting Broadway station opened on 13 September 1926.

Former proposals
A post-war review of rail transport in the London area produced a report in 1946 that proposed many new lines and identified the Morden branch as being the most overcrowded section of the London Underground, needing additional capacity. To relieve the congestion, the report recommended construction of a second pair of tunnels beneath the Northern line's tunnels from Tooting Broadway to Kennington. Trains using the existing tunnels would start and end at Tooting Broadway with the service in the new tunnels joining the existing tunnels to Morden. Designated as route 10, the proposal was not developed by the London Passenger Transport Board or its successor organisations.

In 2013, it was announced that Transport for London's plans for Crossrail 2 included consideration of a station at Tooting Broadway. In October 2015, the plan was changed in favour of a route via Balham.

Incidents
On 6 October 1960, a train crashed into the end wall at the reversing siding. The driver was seriously injured.

On 4 May 1971, in a similar incident to the Moorgate disaster, another train had smashed into the end wall at the reversing siding at around 30mph. Unlike the incident in 1960, this incident ended up killing the driver.

Design
The station is a Grade II listed building. Along with the other stations on the Morden extension, the building was designed by architect Charles Holden. They were Holden's first major project for the Underground. He was selected by Frank Pick, general manager of the Underground Electric Railways Company of London (UERL), to design the stations after he was dissatisfied with designs produced by the UERL's own architect, Stanley Heaps. Built with shops to each side, the modernist design takes the form of a double-height curving screen clad in white Portland stone with a three-part glazed screen in the centre of the façade divided by columns of which the capitals are three-dimensional versions of the Underground roundel. The central panel of the screen contains a large version of the roundel. The station only has access to the platforms via escalators.

Services and connections

Services
Tooting Broadway is between Tooting Bec and Colliers Wood stations on the London Underground Northern line, in Travelcard Zone 3. Train frequencies vary throughout the day, but generally operate every 2–4 minutes between 06:17 and 00:01 in both directions. The typical off-peak service, in trains per hour (tph) is:
5 tph northbound to Edgware via Bank
5 tph northbound to High Barnet via Bank
10 tph southbound to Morden

Southbound trains can terminate at Tooting Broadway on occasion rather than continue on to the end of the line at Morden, which is three stations to the south. To return north, out of service trains run south from the southbound platform into a reversing siding between the two running tunnels before reversing and running north through points on to the northbound platform where they return into service.

Connections
London Bus routes 44, 57, 77, 127, 131, 155, 219, 264, 270, 280, 333, 355, 493 and G1 and night routes N44 and N155 serve the station. In addition, bus routes 57 and 264 provide a 24-hour bus service. Tooting, the nearest railway station, is an 18-minute walk away along the A217 Mitcham Road.

In popular culture
Tooting Broadway station features in the opening credits of the BBC comedy Citizen Smith and again in the closing sequence of the very last episode.

The station is referenced in the title of the Kitchens of Distinction's song "On Tooting Broadway Station" from their third album The Death of Cool.

Notes and references

Notes

References

Bibliography

External links

London Transport Museum Photographic Archive

Northern line stations
Tube stations in the London Borough of Wandsworth
Former City and South London Railway stations
Railway stations in Great Britain opened in 1926
Charles Holden railway stations
Art Deco architecture in London
Tooting
London Underground Night Tube stations
Art Deco railway stations